Norape mexicana is a moth of the Megalopygidae family. It was described by William Schaus in 1892.

References

Moths described in 1892
Megalopygidae